is a Japanese manga artist. She is best known for Clover as well as Tokyo Alice.

Works
 (1990, Bouquet, Shueisha, 1 volume)
 (1991, Bouquet, Shueisha, 2 volumes)
 Miracle(1992–1993, Bouquet, Shueisha, 4 volumes)
 (1993, Bouquet, Shueisha, 1 volume)
 (1993–1994, Bouquet, Shueisha, 4 volumes)
 (1994–1996, Bouquet, Shueisha, 6 volumes)
 (1997–2010, Bouquet→Cookie→Chorus, Shueisha, 24 volumes)
 (2005–2015, Kiss, Kodansha, 15 volumes)
 (2010–2012, Chorus→Cocohana, Shueisha, 4 volumes)
 (2012–ongoing, Cocohana, Shueisha, 8 volumes)
 (2015–ongoing, Kiss, Kodansha, 3 volumes)

References

External links
Official blog 

20th-century Japanese women writers
21st-century Japanese women writers
Japanese female comics artists
Female comics writers
Living people
Women manga artists
Manga artists from Tokyo
Year of birth missing (living people)